The  is given annually since 1987 by the Japan Racing Association (JRA) to the outstanding horses and people in Japanese Thoroughbred horse racing.

The most prestigious award for horses is JRA Award for Horse of the Year.

The equivalent in Australia is the Australian Thoroughbred racing awards, in Canada the Sovereign Awards, in the United States the Eclipse Awards, and in Europe, the Cartier Racing Awards.  

Current awards:
JRA Award for Horse of the Year
JRA Award for Best Two-Year-Old Colt
JRA Award for Best Two-Year-Old Filly
JRA Award for Best Three-Year-Old Colt
JRA Award for Best Three-Year-Old Filly
JRA Award for Best Older Male Horse
JRA Award for Best Older Filly or Mare
JRA Award for Best Sprinter or Miler
JRA Award for Best Dirt Horse
JRA Award for Best Steeplechase Horse
JRA Award for Best Trainer (races won)
JRA Award for Best Trainer (winning average)
JRA Award for Best Trainer (money earned)
JRA Award for Best trainer (training technique)
JRA Award for Best Jockey (races won)
JRA Award for Best Jockey (winning average)
JRA Award for Best Jockey (money earned)
JRA Award for Best Steeplechase Jockey
JRA Award for Best Jockey (newcomer)
JRA Grand Prize Jockey
Most Valuable Jockey
JRA Special Award
JRA Equine Cultural Award
JRA Equine Cultural Award of Merit

The JRA Grand Prize Jockey and JRA Special Award are not regularly given out, as they will only be given if a horse/jockey is sufficiently deserving of the award.

Retired Awards:
JRA Award for Best Horse By Home-bred Sire
JRA Award for Best Anglo-Arab Horse

References
Horse racing in Japan: JRA Awards

Horse racing awards
Horse racing in Japan